Errol McCalla Jr., also known as "Poppi", is an American songwriter, producer, and multi-instrumentalist, best known for his work with Destiny's Child ("8 Days of Christmas"), Tamia ("Long Distance Love"), and Missy Elliott ("Pussycat"), among others.  His work on Elliott's 2002 album Under Construction was nominated for Album of the Year at the 46th Annual Grammy Awards in 2004.

Songwriting and production credits

Credits are courtesy of Discogs, Tidal, Genius, and AllMusic.

Awards and nominations

References 

African-American songwriters
American hip hop record producers
African-American record producers
Year of birth missing (living people)
Living people